Füsun Demirel (born 13 June 1958) is a Turkish actress and interpreter. She played in Gülse Birsel's hit sitcom series Yalan Dünya. She has appeared in more than sixty films since 1982.

Selected filmography

References

External links 

1958 births
Living people
Turkish film actresses